The Secret of St. Pauli (German:Das Geheimnis von St. Pauli) is a 1926 German silent film directed by Rolf Randolf and starring Maria Matray, Hanni Weisse and Ernst Rückert.

The film's sets were designed by the art director Robert A. Dietrich.

Cast
 Maria Matray 
 Hanni Weisse 
 Ernst Rückert 
 Carl de Vogt 
 Hertha von Walther 
 Julius Brandt
 Emmerich Hanus

References

External links

1926 films
Films of the Weimar Republic
Films directed by Rolf Randolf
German silent feature films
Films set in Hamburg
German black-and-white films